Confluentibacter  lentus  is a Gram-negative, aerobic and rod-shaped bacterium from the genus of Confluentibacter which has been isolated from water from Hwajinpo from the Sea of Japan.

References

External links
Type strain of Confluentibacter lentus at BacDive -  the Bacterial Diversity Metadatabase

Flavobacteria
Bacteria described in 2016